The IWA Mid-South Deathmatch Championship was a title in the Independent Wrestling Association Mid-South based in Louisville, Kentucky. The title appeared from 2007, when Drake Younger won a six person Hardcore Rumble to become the first ever champion.

Title History

References

External links
IWA Mid-South Title Histories
2007 IWA Mid-South Results

IWA Mid-South championships
Hardcore wrestling championships